Torrecilla de la Abadesa is a municipality located in the province of Valladolid, Castile and León, Spain. According to the 2004 census (INE), the municipality has a population of 326 inhabitants.

Festivities:

 Saint Anthony of Padua (June 13)
 Saint Roch (August 16)
 Saint Stephen The Protomartyr (December 26)
 Saint Agatha (February 5)
 Los Quintos (May 1)

References

Municipalities in the Province of Valladolid